

Germany 
Some types in use of Luftwaffe and Kriegsmarine
 Baumgartl Heliofly I (backpack Autogyro-glider)
 Baumgartl Heliofly III-57 (two contra-rotating helicopter)
 Baumgartl Heliofly III-59 (little and light disarmable helicopter)
 Doblhoff WNF 342 (Tip-jet helicopter)
 Flettner Fl 265 (twin rotor liaison-observation helicopter, pioneer of synchropter configuration)
 Flettner Fl 282A/B "Kolibri" (reconnaissance synchropter)
 Flettner Fl 339 (reconnaissance helicopter / artillery spotter)
 Focke-Achgelis Fa 223 "Drache" - military transport helicopter, saw limited use for rescue
 Focke-Achgelis Fa 225 - single-seat rotary wing glider, one built
 Focke-Achgelis Fa 330 "Bachstelze" (Autogyro-glider/observation vehicle)
 Focke-Wulf Fw 61 - World's first practical helicopter, first flown in 1936.
 Focke-Wulf Fw C.30A - licence-built Cierva C.30A (general purpose autogyro)
 Nagler-Rolz NR 54 (one-man portable helicopter)
 Nagler-Rolz Nr 55 (one-man portable helicopter)

United States 
In use by USAAF, US Navy and US Coast Guard
 Kellett KD-1 (La Cierva C.30A) (general use Autogyro)
 Platt-LePage XR-1 (experimental helicopter)
 Sikorsky R-4B "Hoverfly" (general helicopter)
 Sikorsky YR-4B "Hoverfly", version of R-4, known as HNS-1 in Navy service (ambulance/sea patrol helicopter)
 Sikorsky R-6 (rescue/reconnaissance helicopter)
 Sikorsky R-5A (rescue/reconnaissance helicopter)
 Vought-Sikorsky VS-300 (experimental helicopter)

United Kingdom 
In use by RAF and FAA
 Avro 671 "Rota" Mk.1 (licence-built Cierva C.30A) (general purpose autogyro - used for radar station testing)
 Bristol "Heliogyro" RI/II (experimental helicopter)
Cierva W.5 - 2-seater twin outrigger rotor helicopter, first flight 1938.
Cierva W.6 - twin rotor helicopter, flown in 1939
Cierva W.9 - jet efflux torque compensation design. Built in 1944 and flown in 1945.
 Hafner Rotabuggy (also known as "Malcolm Rotaplane" and "M.L. 10/42 Flying Jeep") - rotary wing glider attachment for landing jeeps.  Tested in 1944 but introduction of vehicle-carrying gliders led to cancellation of project.
Hafner Rotachute - one-man rotor-kite for landing assault troops. Not adopted but used instead for testing in support of Rotabuggy project
Sikorsky "Hoverfly" I - service name for Sikorsky R-4 used at RAF Helicopter Training School from 1945

Canada 
In use for RCAF
 Avro 671 "Rota" Mk.1 (La Cierva C.30A) (general purpose Autogyro)
 Sikorsky R-4B "Hoverfly" (general purpose helicopter)

Soviet Union 
In use for Red Army and Soviet Air Forces (VVS)
 TsAGI (Kamov) A-7/7bis (Liaison and Observation Autogyro)

Japan 
In use by Japanese Army/Navy Air Service

 Kayaba Ka-1 (autogyro, developed from Kellett KD-1)
 Kayaba Ka-2 (autogyro, different engine to Ka-1)

France 
In use for French Army
 Breguet-Dorand Gyroplane Laboratoire 
 Dorand G.20

References 

S Coates. Helicopters of the Third Reich 2003 Classic Publications 
Ryszard Witkowski, 2009 Allied Rotorcraft of the WW2 Period MMP Books
Ryszard Witkowski, 2007 Rotorcraft of the Third Reich MMP Books

Military helicopters
Rotorcraft